is a railway station on the Hisatsu Line in Kirishima, Kagoshima, Japan, operated by Kyushu Railway Company (JR Kyushu). The station opened in 1908.

Lines
Kirishima-Onsen Station is served by the Hisatsu Line.

Surrounding area
Kagoshima Prefectural Road Route 50
Kirishima Nishiguchi Post Office
Kagoshima Prefectural Kirishima High School
Makizono Nursery
Kirishima Onsen

See also
 List of railway stations in Japan

External links

  

Railway stations in Japan opened in 1908
Railway stations in Kagoshima Prefecture